The 1997 Ivy League Baseball Championship Series took place at Joseph J. O'Donnell Field in Cambridge, Massachusetts on May 10 and 11, 1997.  The series matched the regular season champions of each of the league's two divisions.  , the winner of the series, claimed their first title and the Ivy League's automatic berth in the 1997 NCAA Division I baseball tournament.   It was Harvard's second appearance in the Championship Series, both of which were consecutive, and both of which matched them against Princeton.

Princeton defeated Penn, 11–3, on May 7 in a one-game playoff for the Gehrig Division.  The Tigers also made their second appearance in the Championship Series.  Princeton won the event in 1996.

Results

References

Ivy League Baseball Championship Series
Tournament
Ivy League Baseball Championship Series